The Felton Historic District is a historic district located at Felton, Delaware, United States, that is listed on the National Register of Historic Places.

Description
The district encompasses 162 contributing buildings and 2 contributing structures in the town of Felton built between 1856 and 1940. The district includes a number of 19th and 20th century commercial, institutional, and residential buildings in a variety of popular architectural styles including Queen Anne and Delaware vernacular. Notable buildings include the United Methodist Church, Fountain House Hotel, Odd Fellows Hall, the Jackson hotel, Knights of Pythias Hall, the Alvin B. Connor House, the Godwin house, Hargardine House, and the Former Public School.

It was listed on the National Register of Historic Places January 26, 1988.

See also

 National Register of Historic Places listings in Kent County, Delaware

References

External links

Queen Anne architecture in Delaware
Historic districts in Kent County, Delaware
Historic districts on the National Register of Historic Places in Delaware
National Register of Historic Places in Kent County, Delaware